Alessandro Guidiccioni (died 1605) was a Roman Catholic prelate who served as Bishop of Lucca (1549–1600).

Biography
On 9 January 1549, Alessandro Guidiccioni was appointed during the papacy of Pope Paul III as Coadjutor Bishop of Lucca and succeeded to the bishopric on 4 November 1549.
He served as Bishop of Lucca until his resignation in 1600. 
He died in 1605.

While bishop, he was the principal co-consecrator of Antonmaria Sauli, Titular Archbishop of Philadelphia in Arabia and Apostolic Nuncio to Naples (1586).

References 

16th-century Italian Roman Catholic bishops
17th-century Italian Roman Catholic bishops
Bishops appointed by Pope Paul III
1605 deaths